Aymaumakhi (Dargwa: ГӀяймаумахьи) is a rural locality (a selo) and the administrative centre of Aymaumakhinskoye Rural Settlement, Sergokalinsky District, Republic of Dagestan, Russia. The population was 256 as of 2010. There is 1 street.

Geography 
Aymaumakhi is located 22 km southwest of Sergokala (the district's administrative centre) by road. Chabazimakhi and Khabaymakhi are the nearest rural localities.

Nationalities 
Dargins live there.

Famous residents 
 Guseyn Azizov (Hero of Socialist Labor)
 Magomed Gamidov (People's poet of Dagestan)

References 

Rural localities in Sergokalinsky District